Eolepadidae is an extinct family of barnacles in the order Eolepadomorpha. There are 2 genera and about 12 described species in Eolepadidae.

Genera
These genera belong to the family Eolepadidae:
 Eolepas Withers, 1928
 Toarcolepas Gale & Schweigert, 2015

References

Crustaceans